Ibrahem Al-Hasan (born 22 August 1986) is a Kuwaiti table tennis player. He competed at the 2008 and 2012 Summer Olympics in the Men's singles, but was defeated in the first round in both Games.

References

External links
 

Kuwaiti male table tennis players
1986 births
Living people
Olympic table tennis players of Kuwait
Table tennis players at the 2008 Summer Olympics
Table tennis players at the 2012 Summer Olympics
Table tennis players at the 1998 Asian Games
Table tennis players at the 2002 Asian Games
Table tennis players at the 2006 Asian Games
Asian Games competitors for Kuwait
21st-century Kuwaiti people